Peter Owen Seddon (born 1937), is a male former athlete who competed for England.

Athletics career
Seddon was selected by England to represent his country in athletics events.

He represented England and in the hammer throw, at the 1966 British Empire and Commonwealth Games in Kingston, Jamaica.

References

1937 births
English male hammer throwers
Athletes (track and field) at the 1966 British Empire and Commonwealth Games
Living people
Commonwealth Games competitors for England